Ukerewe may refer to:

 Ukerewe Constituency, a parliamentary constituency in Ukerewe District, Tanzania 
 Ukerewe District, a district in Mwanza Region, Tanzania
 Ukerewe Island, an island in Lake Victoria, Tanzania
 Lake Ukerewe, a name for Lake Victoria predating British arrival in the region